The 1956 Louisville Cardinals football team was an American football team that represented the University of Louisville as an independent during the 1956 NCAA College Division football season. In their 11th season under head coach Frank Camp, the Cardinals compiled a 6–3 record.

The team's statistical leaders included Ken Porco with 581 rushing yards and Dale Orem with 385 passing yards.

Schedule

References

Louisville
Louisville Cardinals football seasons
Louisville Cardinals football